Young Gabby Goose is a 1975 anthology of 14 animal-centered fairy tales from around the world, collected and retold by Ruth Manning-Sanders. These tales are written for a younger level of reader than Manning-Sanders' more familiar A Book of... series of fairy tales. This book was republished in a paperback edition in 1976.

Contents
 Young Gabby Goose and Mr Fickle Fox (Transylvania)
 Hello, House! (Zanzibar)
 Clever Sparrow (Transylvania)
 Koko and the Waterfall (North Africa)
 Dove, Fox and Raven (Finland)
 Baby Brother and the Geese (Russia)
 Pussy Bauldron and Dog Towser (Finland)
 The Glove (Ukraine)
 The Kitten and the Knitting-Needles (Germany)
 Snail Walking (France)
 Snail and Wolf (Italy)
 The Turnip (Bohemia)
 Old Man and the Rock (Red Indian)
 The Letter in the Egg (Swabia)

1975 short story collections
Collections of fairy tales
Children's short story collections
British children's books
Methuen Publishing books
Animal tales
1975 children's books
Books about cats
Books about dogs
Books about foxes
Wolves in literature
Literature featuring anthropomorphic foxes
1975 anthologies